The City of Charters Towers was a local government area in North Queensland, Australia, consisting of the centre and suburbs of the town of Charters Towers. Established in 1877, it was entirely surrounded by the Shire of Dalrymple, with which it amalgamated in 2008 to form the Charters Towers Region.

History 
The Borough of Charters Towers was proclaimed on 21 June 1877 under the Municipal Institutions Act 1864. It achieved a measure of autonomy in 1878 with the enactment of the Local Government Act. With the passage of the Local Authorities Act 1902, the Borough of Charters Towers became the Town of Charters Towers on 31 March 1903.

On 13 April 1909, Charters Towers was proclaimed a City.

A separate Shire of Queenton was excised from the surrounding Dalrymple Division on 2 July 1902 and merged with the City of Charters Towers on 23 December 1916.

On 15 March 2008, under the Local Government (Reform Implementation) Act 2007 passed by the Parliament of Queensland on 10 August 2007, the City of Charters Towers amalgamated with the Shire of Dalrymple to form the Charters Towers Region.

Suburbs 
The City of Charter Towers included the following settlements:

 Alabama Hill
 Columbia
 Grand Secret
 Lissner (later renamed Charters Towers City)
 Millchester
 Mosman Park
 Queenton
 Richmond Hill
 Toll
 Towers Hill

Population

Mayors

In the early period of local government in Queensland, elections for aldermen were held annually and the mayor was elected from among the aldermen. Later the mayor became directly elected but still on an annual basis. Finally there was the move to three-year election cycles.
 1877–?: John McDonald
 1894: Frederick Johnson (son of South Australian politician Thomas Johnson)
 1897: Edward Miles 1897 
 1901: P. J. Allen 
 1903: Frederick Johnson  
 1908: David Rollston  
 1908: William Grant Clark 
 David (Dave) Missingham
 1913–1914: Frederick Johnson  
 1916: C. Watts 
 1925: Thomas Chappe
 1927: Charles Brownson 
Bryan Beveridge

References

Former local government areas of Queensland
1877 establishments in Australia
Charters Towers
2008 disestablishments in Australia
Populated places disestablished in 2008